Old Baldy is a  double summit mountain located in Teton County of the U.S. state of Montana.

Description

The west summit is slightly higher than the 9,150-foot east summit, and approximately 1,000 feet distance separates the two. Old Baldy is located along the Rocky Mountain Front, which is a subset of the Rocky Mountains. It is situated 11 miles east of the Continental Divide, in the Bob Marshall Wilderness, on land managed by Lewis and Clark National Forest. The nearest town is Choteau, 29 miles to the east, and nearest access is the South Fork Teton Road 109. Precipitation runoff from the east side of the mountain drains into headwaters of South Fork Teton River, and the west side drains into tributaries of the North Fork Sun River. The Old Baldy name was officially adopted by the United States Board on Geographic Names on December 31, 1959.

Geology

Old Baldy is composed of sedimentary rock laid down during the Precambrian to Jurassic periods. Formed in shallow seas, this sedimentary rock was pushed east and over the top of younger rock during the Laramide orogeny.

Climate

Based on the Köppen climate classification, Old Baldy is located in a subarctic climate zone characterized by long, usually very cold winters, and mild to warm summers. Winter temperatures can drop below −10 °F with wind chill factors below −30 °F.

See also

 Geology of the Rocky Mountains

References

External links

 Weather: Old Baldy

Mountains of Montana
North American 2000 m summits
Lewis and Clark National Forest